Ligao station is a railway station located on the South Main Line in Albay, Philippines. It is currently used for the Bicol Express and Bicol Commuter.

Philippine National Railways stations
Railway stations in Albay